The 2016 Baylor Bears football team represented Baylor University in the 2016 NCAA Division I FBS football season. The Bears were coached by interim head coach Jim Grobe in their 118th football season. This was the team's third season in McLane Stadium in Waco, Texas. The Bears were members of the Big 12 Conference. They finished the season 7–6, 3–6 in Big 12 play to finish in a three-way tie for sixth place. They were invited to Cactus Bowl where they defeated Boise State.

Recruiting

National Signing Day was on February 3, 2016.

Scandal

In September 2015, following the conviction of former players Sam Ukwuachu and Tevin Elliott of sexual assault, along with allegations against other players, the school commissioned law firm Pepper Hamilton LLP to conduct an independent external investigation regarding the university's handling of sexual violence. In April 2016, former player Shawn Oakman was arrested on sexual assault charges as well. Head coach Art Briles was terminated on May 26, 2016 following the presentation of Pepper Hamilton's report. University President Ken Starr and Athletic Director Ian McCaw also resigned. Former Wake Forest head coach Jim Grobe was hired on an interim basis.

Following the threat of a lawsuit by Briles for wrongful termination, Baylor provided an out of court settlement. Briles and Baylor are co-defendants in a lawsuit filed by a woman allegedly sexually assaulted by a football player. After Briles' departure, many players announced their intention to transfer including Jarrett Stidham. Seven members of the 2016 recruiting class requested to be released from their National Letter of Intent, and six of the then-seven commits in the 2017 recruiting class decommitted.

Schedule

Schedule Source:

Rankings

Game summaries

Northwestern State

SMU

at Rice

Oklahoma State

at Iowa State

Kansas

at Texas

TCU

at Oklahoma

Kansas State

vs. Texas Tech

at West Virginia

Boise State–Cactus Bowl

References

Baylor
Baylor Bears football seasons
Guaranteed Rate Bowl champion seasons
Baylor Bears football